Rubia agostinhoi is a climbing plant species of the Rubiaceae family endemic to the Azores It was defined by ecologist Pierre Dansereau and  Pinto da Silva in 1977.

Description
It has narrowly elliptical to linear or oblanceolate leathery, dark green leaves with very small, slightly revolted spines in the margins. Leaves of the side shoots are shorter and smaller in length than those of the main stem.

Distribution and Habitat
It is present in all of the Azorean islands, except Graciosa. It is commonly found in ravines, craters, natural forests and heather bushes. From sea level to altitudes above .

References

agostinhoi
Plants described in 1977
Endemic flora of the Azores